Kiewit is a Belgian parish and village within the northernmost section of the Dutch (Flemish) speaking municipality of Hasselt. It borders on the municipality of Zonhoven to the north and Genk to the east, with Kuringen, a part of Hasselt, to the west.

History
Until the 20th century, Kiewit was relatively uninhabited and was composed of open heathland and pastures between the older settlements of Kuringen, Hasselt, Zonhoven, with Kiewit representing the section claimed by Hasselt. Hasselt became a parish within the Belgian Catholic church in 1927, and the population concentrated at first in the area around the parish church.

Transport

Kiewit is on the main road between Hasselt and Eindhoven, which cuts through the village. Kiewit also has its own train station situated in the south.

Sights worth seeing
 Kiewit airfield, the oldest aerodrome in Belgium
 The parish church (Catholic) dedicated to Saint Lambert and dating from 1935
 Boundary marker ("paalsteen") dating to 1666 between Hasselt, Zonhoven, and Kuringen.

Annual events
 Pukkelpop
 Rimpelrock

Nature and recreation

The Natuurdomein Kiewit (Nature domain) is in the east of Kiewit centred on an old manor house, and is a "nature centre" under the city of Hasselt with an area of about 100 hectares. It touches the Provincial domain of Bokrijk, in Genk, and is also linked to it with bicycle paths. It has a children farm and a project to let Galloway cattle maintain the grasslands.

Famous inhabitants
Willy Claes (born 1938), politician and former Secretary General of NATO

References

External links
Kiewit homepage
The local newsletter: KrisKrasKiewit
Information about Kiewit

Hasselt
Populated places in Limburg (Belgium)